Styx River is a stream in the U.S. state of Ohio.

The river was named after the Styx, a river in Greek mythology.

See also
List of rivers of Ohio

References

Rivers of Medina County, Ohio
Rivers of Wayne County, Ohio
Rivers of Ohio